Eurographics is a Europe-wide professional computer graphics association. The association supports its members in advancing the state of the art in computer graphics and related fields such as multimedia, scientific visualization and human–computer interaction.

Overview 

Eurographics organizes many events and services, which are open to everyone. Eurgraphics has a broad membership, including researchers & developers, educators & industrialists, users & providers of computer graphics hardware, software, and applications. Eurgraphics organizes venues including the Eurographics Symposium on Rendering and High-Performance Graphics. Eurographics publishes Computer Graphics Forum, a quarterly journal, among others.

Symposiums 
 Annual Conference
 3D Object Retrieval
 Computer Animation
 EuroVis
 EXPRESSIVE
 Geometry Processing
 Graphics and Cultural Heritage
 High-Performance Graphics
 Intelligent Cinematography and Editing
 Material Appearance Modeling
 Parallel Graphics and Visualization
 Rendering (EGSR)
 Urban Data Modeling and Visualization
 Virtual Environments
 Visual Computing in Biology and Medicine

Related organizations 
 ACM SIGGRAPH hosts SIGGRAPH, the world's largest computer graphics conference.
 Russian Computer Graphics Society hosts Graphicon, the former Soviet Union's largest computer graphics conference, in cooperation with Eurographics.

References

External links 
 Eurographics website
 Eurographics Digital Library
 Eurographics 2019 conference website
 Eurographics 2018 conference website
 Eurographics 2017 conference website
 Eurographics 2016 conference website
 Eurographics 2015 conference website
 Eurographics 2014 conference website
 Eurographics 2013 conference website
 Eurographics 2012 conference website
 Ke-Sen Huang page contains a directory of Eurographics publications.

Computer graphics organizations
Information technology organizations based in Europe